Biochemical and Organic Simulation System (BOSS) is a general-purpose molecular modeling program that performs molecular mechanics calculations, Metropolis Monte Carlo statistical mechanics simulations, and semiempirical Austin Model 1 (AM1), PM3, and PDDG/PM3 quantum mechanics calculations. The molecular mechanics calculations cover energy minimizations, normal mode analysis and conformational searching with the Optimized Potentials for Liquid Simulations (OPLS) force fields. BOSS is developed by Prof. William L. Jorgensen at Yale University, and distributed commercially by Cemcomco, LLC and Schrödinger, Inc.

Key features 
 OPLS force field inventor
 Geometry optimization
 Semiempirical quantum chemistry
 MC simulations for pure liquids, solutions, clusters or gas-phase systems
 Free energies are computed from statistical perturbation (free energy perturbation (FEP)) theory
 TIP3P, TIP4P, and TIP5P water models

See also

References

External links 
 

Molecular modelling software
Monte Carlo molecular modelling software